Club Deportivo Ribaforada is a sports club based in Ribaforada (Navarre, Spain). It was founded as a football club, named Club Deportivo Imperio, in 1921. It is the third oldest team of Navarre. It plays in the category Regional Preferente. The highest category is that it has reached the Tercera División. It played in the Campo de Fútbol San Bartolomé. Its reserve team is CDM Ribaforada.

Season to season

11 seasons in Tercera División

Famous players
 Eduardo Aizpún Andueza
 Enrique Enériz
 Óscar Gurría
 Ivelin Vasilev

External links
Official website 
«Ribaforada1921», news of the C.D. Ribaforada 
futbolme.com profile 
navarrafutbolclic.com profile 

Football clubs in Navarre
Association football clubs established in 1921
Divisiones Regionales de Fútbol clubs
1921 establishments in Spain